Digimon World DS, known in Japan as , is a role-playing video game for the Nintendo DS developed by BEC and published by Bandai Namco Games. The game was released in Japan on June 15, 2006, and in North America later that year on November 7. Despite its localized title, the game shares no relation to the separate Digimon World series.

The Digimon Story series has spawned several sequels; including Digimon World Dawn and Dusk, Digimon Story Lost Evolution, Digimon Story: Super Xros Wars Red and Blue, Digimon Story: Cyber Sleuth and Digimon Story: Cyber Sleuth – Hacker's Memory.

Gameplay

In the game, the player controls a Digimon tamer and embarks on a journey to discover, tame, raise, train various Digimon. The player can build Digi-Farms to raise, evolve and communicate with the Digimon. Using Wi-Fi and local DS wireless connection, players can interact by exchanging Digimon, engaging in battles, and pooling resources to create rare types of Digimon.

Plot 
The game's plot features characters and settings loosely based on the Digimon Data Squad anime series (known as Digimon Savers in Japan). The story sees player character transported to the Digital World, where he or she raises and befriends Digimon and fights an evil entity calling himself "Unknown-D".

Reception

Famitsu gave the game a relatively positive score of 30/40, receiving cross review scores of 8, 7, 8, and 7, respectively, as well as earning a "must buy" recommendation for the month. It also appeared in Famitsu's list of 100 best selling Nintendo DS games in their December 2006 issue, ranking in at number 33, with 213,770 copies sold.

Reviews in English-speaking countries for Digimon World DS have generally been favorable, averaging at a 72% on GameRankings.

IGN reviewer Jack DeVries claims that "...despite its derivative nature and somewhat mediocre elements, it's still a lot of fun..." and recommends the game "...for players that are dying to get their monster battling RPG fix", also meriting it for its humorous scriptwriting and unique method of collecting Digimon, giving it a final score of 7.5/10. GamePro gives the game a 3.75/5, saying "old Digimon fans will absolutely love this game; it's a repackaging of the older Digimons, but with much more to do." Game Vortex has given the strongest review of 83%, saying that it's "great for Digimon fans."

References

External links
Official site   

2006 video games
Bandai Namco games
World DS
Multiplayer online games
Nintendo DS games
Nintendo DS-only games
Nintendo Wi-Fi Connection games
Role-playing video games
Video games developed in Japan
Video games with isometric graphics
Video games featuring protagonists of selectable gender